The Konkan Railway (abbreviated KR) is one of the 19 railway zones in India with its headquarters at CBD Belapur in Navi Mumbai, Maharashtra, India. The first passenger train ran on Konkan railway tracks on 20 March 1993, between Udupi and Mangalore. During its initial years of operation in the mountainous Konkan region, a number of accidents prompted Konkan Railway to implement new technology. Anti-collision devices, the Sky Bus and roll-on/roll-off are several of the railway's innovations. The first train on the completed track was sent off on 26 January 1998.

History

Background

For most of the modern era, the Konkan coast of India did not have a railway link connecting its coastal cities, towns and villages. Even the British who ruled India until 1947 did not build a railway along this route. The first proposal was surveyed in 1920. In 1957 an aerial survey was conducted of the area between Dasgaon, Raigad District in Maharashtra and Mangalore with the object of studying the possibilities of railway development in this region.

The long-pending demand of this region was fulfilled by George Fernandes who was the Railway minister in V.P. Singh's government, backed by then Finance minister Madhu Dandavate and Vice Chairman of Planning Commission Ramakrishna Hegde. They set up Konkan Railway Corporation Limited headed by E.Sreedharan for executing Konkan railway line to tide over funds crunch of Indian Railways.

The first phase of the Konkan Railway was the  section from Apta to Roha. It was cleared by the Planning Commission, and the project was included in the 1978-79 budget at an estimated cost of 11.19 billion. The engineering and traffic survey for the West Coast Railway Line from Apta to Mangalore was conducted from 1970 to 1972. The final survey for the Apta-Roha-Dasgaon section was made in 1974–75.

Challenges
The project involved over 2,116 bridges (of which the Panvalnadi bridge was the highest viaduct in India till 2010, Now Jhajjhar Khad is the highest viaduct in India) and 92 tunnels and was the largest railway project of the century in Asia. A major challenge was land acquisition from about 43,000 landowners. When the Konkan Railway Corporation (KRCL) began asking people to surrender property which had belonged to them for generations, many (convinced of the project's importance) did so voluntarily. This enabled the process to be completed in one year. The longest bridge is on the River Sharavathi, spanning  and the longest Tunnel is in Karbude near Ratnagiri, stretching .

Terrain and the elements were challenging; flash floods, loose soil, landslides and tunnel collapses affected work at many places on the project. Thickly-forested construction sites were often visited by wild animals.

The route crosses three states (Maharashtra, Goa and Karnataka), each of which agreed to provide financing. The authorised share capital was increased in 1996-1997 from 6 billion to 8 billion, with the government of India taking a 51-percent share; the rest went to Maharashtra (22 percent), Karnataka (15 percent), Kerala (6 percent) and Goa (6 percent).

Contracts for the project were given to construction firms which included Larsen & Toubro who were given a major part of the project, Gammon India and Afcons. To speed up construction, piers for major bridges were cast on riverbanks itself and launched with pontoon-mounted cranes. This was India's first use of incremental launch bridge-building. The greatest challenge was presented by the nine tunnels bored through soft soil, which required a slow, manual process. Excavation was difficult due to saturated clay and high water table. Tunnels collapsed immediately several times, requiring the work to be redone. Nineteen lives and four years were lost in the construction of the soft-soil tunnels alone, and a total of seventy-four people died during the railway's construction.

Controversy
In Goa, which makes up  of the route, concerns were raised about the environmental and economic impact of the railway. According to opponents of the project, the coastal railway would destroy habitat, damage historical sites, and disrupt lives in the densely-populated state. In 1991, the Konkan Railway Re-Alignment Committee (KRRAC) organised protests against the proposed railway line. The KRRAC's main points were that the proposal would flood coastal regions, destroy fertile land, harm the monuments of Old Goa, irreparably damage the marshes and mangrove swamps along the coast and the estuaries of the Mandovi and Zuari Rivers, and displace neighbourhoods along the coast. The committee proposed an alternative hinterland alignment passing through relatively-unpopulated regions, which would extend the line by about  but reduce environmental damage.
But the hinterland alignment was rejected by the Konkan Railway Corporation because it would substantially lengthen & divert the line, deny rail access to Goa's population centers, and delay and increase the costs of construction. The KRRAC, which had become a political movement, filed public interest litigation in the Bombay High Court in March 1992 seeking an injunction on construction work and diversion of the line through the hinterland alignment. The high court dismissed the petition the following month, ruling that  The Konkan Railway Re-Alignment Committee (KRRAC) now under new name Save Konkan Ecology Forum (SKEF) is strictly & violently opposing Doubling & Electrification Works of Konkan Railway Line, planned by Indian Railways in 2014/2015, citing concerns about the environmental and economic impact, destruction habitat, damage historical sites, and disrupt lives in the densely-populated state. Maharashtra, Karnataka & Kerala  Governments had given Green signal for doubling & electrification of Konkan Railway Line in 2015/2016.

Completion
In March 1993, the southern  between Thokur,  from Mangalore, (now Mangaluru) and Udupi in Karnataka entered service, followed by the northern  section between Roha and Veer in Maharashtra in June of that year. The first passenger train on the route ran between Mangalore and Udupi on 20 March 1993.

Through services between Mumbai and Mangalore remained on hold due to a problematic tunnel at Pernem, which experienced repeated cave-ins and flooding. The tunnel was finally completed in January 1998, six years after its construction began. Through services on the line began after the inauguration of the full  stretch from Roha to Mangalore on 26 January 1998. Passenger service on the full route, between Mumbai and Mangalore, began in May 1998.

Improvements

Track doubling
Several stretches on the  line can be converted to double track, such as the  line from Roha to Veer, which is now doubled. The  stretch between Udupi and Mangalore is another candidate. The  track from Madure to Vaibhavwadi Road is entirely flat terrain and can easily be converted into Double Track. The  track from Panvel Junction to Roha has been doubled.

On 3 November 2015, Konkan Railway senior official Bhanu P. Tayal announced to the press that track-doubling and electrification would begin on 8 November in Kolad. Life Insurance Corporation offered a favourable 2.5 billion loan, and other funding would be available. The project, expected to cost 100 billion, was scheduled for completion by 2020. In October 2018, the railway announced that the  stretch between Roha and Veer would have two tracks by December 2019.

Matsyagandha Express ( Train number 02619 run as special) travelling from Lokmanya Tilak Terminus, Mumbai (LTT) to Mangaluru Central (MAQ) became first train to take Roha-Veer double line on Konkan railway route on 30 August 2021 at 7.30p.m.

Electrification
The foundation stone laying for electrification of the Konkan railway line was done in November 2015. The entire 741 kilometer route stretching from Roha, Maharashtra to Thokur, Karnataka has been electrified in March 2022. Inspection of the entire stretch was completed in six phases starting in March 2020. The last stretch between Ratnagiri and Thivim was inspected on March 24 and authorisation was obtained on March 28.

New stations
The railway was scheduled to have new crossing stations at Indapur, Goregaon Road, Sape Wamne, Kalambani Budruk, Kadavai, Veravali, Kharepatan Road, Achirne, Mirjan and Innanje by December 2019. Most of these stations are operational now.

Operations

Passenger
The route is popular with passengers due to its connectivity with regions hitherto inaccessible by rail and the substantial time savings for travellers between western and southern India. Several trains which had taken circuitous routes ran on the Konkan Railway, reducing  running time. The first of these was the Mumbai-Mangalore Netravati Express (later extended to Trivandrum), which was diverted to the Konkan Railway on 1 March 1998; this was followed by the Thiruvananthapuram Rajdhani Express on 1 April of that year. The Matsyagandha Express, running from Lokmanya Tilak Terminus to Mangalore, began service on 1 May 1998. The Hazrat Nizamuddin-Mangalore Mangala Lakshadweep Express was diverted to the route and extended to Ernakulam Junction on 1 August 1998. The Pune-Ernakulam Junction Express was introduced on 25 February 1999. The Marusagar Express, which runs between Jaipur and Ernakulam Junction and was extended to Ajmer via the Konkan Railway, began service on 12 October 2001. The Jan Shatabdi Express was flagged off between Mumbai and Madgaon (the longest-running Jan Shatabdi) on 16 April 2002 to commemorate Indian Railways' 150th anniversary. On 1 February 2008, a Garib Rath Express between the Kochuveli railway station in Thiruvananthapuram and Lokmanya Tilak Terminus began service.

The Tejas Express is the first semi-high-speed, fully air-conditioned train fleet introduced by Indian Railways, with modern on-board facilities. Its inaugural run was on 24 May 2017 from Mumbai's Chhatrapati Shivaji Terminus to Karmali railway station in Goa. It covered 552 km (342 mi) in eight hours and 30 minutes.

Freight

Freight response to the railway was lukewarm, prompting its corporation to consider reducing its rates. With an outstanding debt of 33.75 billion, the KRCL was counting on freight traffic for revenue. To attract freight traffic, the corporation began advertising to industries on the route.

The corporation introduced roll-on/roll-off (RORO) service, a road-rail system, on the section between Kolad (Maharashtra) and Verna, Goa in 1999; it was extended to the Surathkal railway station in Karnataka in 2004. The RORO service, the first of its kind in India, allowed trucks to be transported on flatcars. It has been popular, carrying about 1.6 million trucks and earning over 1.2 billion by 2009.

Safety
The terrain and weather of the Konkan region have caused problems for the railway. During the 1998 monsoon, torrential rains triggered landslides which washed away tracks and disrupted service. Despite the corporation's efforts to address the problems through engineering (such as protective netting along cuttings to prevent boulders from rolling onto the tracks), the problems recurred each year.

The line's first major accident occurred on the night of 22 June 2003, when a landslide derailed a Karwar–Mumbai express train at the entrance to a tunnel. Fifty-one people died as a result of the accident, and others were injured. As a result, the corporation was severely criticised for failing to take adequate safety measures in the landslide-prone region. An inquiry reported that the cause of the accident was the failure of a cutting due to the lack of monsoon patrolling. The findings were disputed by the corporation, which said that the lack of monsoon patrolling did not lead to the accident (which was due to forces of nature). Shortly after the accident, however, the corporation announced that it would enhance safety measures on the route.

Barely a year later, the measures were found inadequate when a second major accident occurred on 16 June 2004. A Mangalore–Mumbai Matsyaganda Express derailed and fell off a bridge after striking boulders on the tracks, killing 20 people. Again, the corporation insisted that the accident was due to forces of nature. Questions were then raised about the safety and reliability of the Konkan Railway. An inquiry by the Commissioner of Railway Safety ruled that the accident was caused by the "falling of boulders and earth" on the tracks. After the report was issued, the corporation implemented its recommendations.

A goods train carrying fertilizers derailed between Diwankhavti and Khed station(83/7Km)at 15.57 Hrs on 10 May 2020. This happened during Covid-19 virus lockdown when regular passenger and goods trains were stopped by Central or Union government of India. There was no injury or casualty. Traffic resumed on the railway on 13 May 2020 at 9.15 Hrs.</ref>

See also
 Indian Railways
 Konkan Railway Corporation

References

External links

 
Railway lines opened in 1998
Zones of Indian Railways